John Joseph Lalor ( to 9 June 1899) was an American political scientist, a translator of work by Ludwig Nohl and Wilhelm Roscher, and the publisher of Cyclopaedia of Political Science, Political Economy, and the Political History of the United States (1895).

Biography

In 1885, Lalor taught at East Side High School, Milwaukee.  Lalor worked as a translator in the Director of Mint, U. S. Treasury Department.  Lalor collaborated with Louis Wolowski, Ludwig Nohl, and Paul Shorey.  He translated works by Rudolf von Jhering and Wilhelm Roscher.  He translated from German two works by Ludwig Nohl, a biography of Ludwig Beethoven in Life of Beethoven (1881) and Wolfgang Mozart in Life of Mozart (1880).

In 1899, Lalor died from injuries due to a fall.

Works or publications
  
  with L. Nohl
  with L. Nohl
   with G. F. Roscher and L. Wolowski
  translated from German by Lalor
  with H. Von Holst, Alfred Bishop Mason, P. Shorey, Brainerd, Ira Hutchinson
  with Alfred Bishop Mason

See also
 Rudolf von Jhering
 Ludwig Nohl
 Wilhelm Roscher
 Paul Shorey
 Louis Wolowski

References

Further reading
 

American political scientists
1899 deaths